Assad Badyr Fudadin (born 1 August 1985) is a West Indian cricketer who plays for the Guyana national team and the West Indies. Born in Guyana, he bats left-handed but bowls right-arm medium-fast.

In 2000, he was selected to play for the West Indies Under-15s team at the Costcutter Under-15s World Challenge, at which he top-scored in the final with 55 off 92 balls as the West Indies beat Pakistan. The following year, he progressed to the Guyana Under-19s team, for which he played for two years before being selected for the West Indies U19s.

Fudadin made his first-class debut in 2004, playing for the West Indies B team against Kenya in the 2003–04 Carib Beer Cup. The following season, he returned to play for Guyana in the same competition, before going to England in April 2005 to play a season of club cricket for Wollaton Cricket Club in the Nottinghamshire Cricket Board Premier League. After his spell at Wollaton CC, he spent three years from 2006 to 2008 playing for Trowbridge Cricket Club in West of England Premier League Premier 2. During that time, he scored 2,659 runs at an average of 85.77 and took 60 wickets at an average of 26.53.

After a few years playing domestic cricket in the West Indies, Fudadin was called into the West Indies A team in 2010 for a home series against Zimbabwe and then a tour of England before another home series against Pakistan A. His exploits earned him a developmental contract with the West Indies Cricket Board.

In 2012, Fudadin received a call-up to the senior West Indies side for their summer tour of England. After being unused for the first two matches, he made his Test debut in the third match, the start of which was delayed by two days due to rain.

After being absent for the 2016 competition, he was selected once again by the Guyana Amazon Warriors for the 2017 CPL, this time as a 12th round pick in the draft. In June 2021, he was selected to take part in the Minor League Cricket tournament in the United States following the players' draft.

References

External links

1985 births
Living people
Guyanese cricketers
People from East Berbice-Corentyne
West Indies Test cricketers
Guyana cricketers
Guyana Amazon Warriors cricketers
West Indies B cricketers
Jamaica cricketers
Indo-Guyanese people